Ensel and Krete is the second novel of the Zamonia series written and illustrated by German author Walter Moers. This novel has not been published in English. It was released in Germany around June 2000.

Background
Ensel and Krete is subtitled 'A Fairy Tale from Zamonia'. It is a play-off of the Grimm's Fairy Tales 'Hansel and Gretel'. The book is written by Optimus Yarnspinner. Its main characters are Ensel and Krete, two Fhernhachenkinders – half dwarves, which are lost in a large forest in which much danger hides.

2000 German novels
Novels by Walter Moers
German fantasy novels